Muhammad Nur Aziz Wardana (born September 25, 1994), is an Indonesian professional basketball player.  He currently plays for the Pacific Caesar Surabaya club of the Indonesian Basketball League.

He represented Indonesia's national basketball team at the 2016 SEABA Cup, where he was his team's best rebounder and shot blocker.

References

External links
 Indonesian Basketball League profile
 Asia-basket.com profile

1994 births
Living people
Indonesian men's basketball players
Centers (basketball)
Sportspeople from Surabaya